is a Japanese manga series written by Norie Yamada and illustrated by Kumichi Yoshizuki. It was serialized in Fujimi Shobo's Comic Dragon magazine from May 2002 to January 2003 and was later collected in two bound volumes. In 2006, Tokyopop released the manga in the United States under the name Someday's Dreamers.

Someday's Dreamers was also adapted into an anime television series that was animated by J.C.Staff under the direction of Masami Shimoda.  It is loosely based on the storyline of the first manga series with new characters added to the story.  It ran for a total of 12 episodes on TV Asahi and was later licensed by Geneon Entertainment USA. After the closure of Geneon USA, the series was relicensed by Sentai Filmworks.

Another story set in the same universe, written and drawn by the same author and illustrator, was serialized in Kadokawa Shoten's Comic Dragon Age.  It ran from December 2003 to February 2006 and was later released in five bound volumes.  In 2006, Tokyopop released the manga in the United States.

In 2007, Norie Yamada and Kumichi Yoshizuki began work on a third title in the Someday's Dreamers universe titled .  It was serialized in Kadokawa Shoten's Monthly Shōnen Ace and began its run in the April issue, released on February 26, 2008. Summer Skies was scheduled to have a live action movie adaptation released on December 20, 2008, though it was originally scheduled for a summer 2008 premiere.  The story was also adapted into an anime television series, following the new main character, Sora.  The series is directed by Osamu Kobayashi and is animated by Hal Film Maker. It aired on TV Asahi from July 2, 2008 to September 24, 2008.

Plot

Someday's Dreamers
The story is set in present-day Tokyo. Much of the setting is based upon real areas, the more obvious ones being the Shibuya Crossing and the Tokyo Tower. The main backdrop of the series where all the characters reside is Shimokitazawa, roughly six minutes west of Shibuya on the Keio Inokashira Line.  The Bureau of Magic is in Tokyo, which employs Mage Labor for certain special requests by everyday people.  However, the mages must only use their magic with special permission, and any unlicensed use results in a penalty.  The story is very gentle and centers around the protagonist, a witch named , a second-year senior high school student from Tono in Iwate prefecture. In order to train as a magic user, she travels to Tokyo during her summer break to apprentice under the charming . The story tells of Yume's trials and tribulations as she works toward her eventual graduation as a full-fledged magic user licensed by the Bureau of Magic. There is a strong undercurrent of romance which is never resolved.

Mahōtsukai ni Taisetsu na Koto: Natsu no Sora
Sora Suzuki is a cheerful girl with magical abilities who lives with her mother in the small town of Biei, Hokkaido. With the intention to honour a promise made to her late father, she successfully applies for a magic internship in Tokyo and temporarily moves into a boarding house in the city. Over the course of a summer month, she meets other teenagers studying to become accredited mages, including an initially aloof boy who appears to lack magic abilities. Under the guidance of their mentors, the apprentices learn more about magic, each other and life in general as they attend formal classes and work to fulfil contractual assignments for clients.

In the manga, Sora has a strange trait to her magic that manifests itself despite her ire; whenever Sora casts a spell, the end result always involves sunflowers, though otherwise almost always how Sora intended it. This is absent in the anime.

Cast

Someday's Dreamers
Yume Kikuchi – 
Masami Oyamada – 
Angela Charon Brooks – 
Melinda Iwashita – 
Go Kato – 
Gin Pun –

Mahō Tsukai ni Taisetsu na Koto: Natsu no Sora
Sora Suzuki – , Performed by: Rio Yamashita (live action)
Seiichirou Hara – , Performed by: Tetsushi Tanaka (live action)
Gouta Midorikawa – , Performed by: Masaki Okada (live action)
Hiyori Yamabuki – 
Honomi Asagi – , Performed by: Yurie Midori (live action)
Saori Shiraishi – , Performed by: Hana Kino (live action)
Kouji Kuroda – , Performed by: Taiga (live action)

Music
The composer of the anime soundtrack, Takefumi Haketa, hoped that girls would identify with the lead role and created music which had a nostalgic feel to it, evoking both English and Irish suburbs, but also memories of the European Middle Ages. Using traditional instruments such as Irish whistles, he created tracks based on jigs, reels and a real salsa track. For two themes, he employed the voices of a 10-member-strong choir of schoolchildren. The vocal songs were also arranged by Haketa and sung by Miki Taoka. The CD of the soundtrack was released in the U.S. in 2003 by Pioneer Anime LDC, Inc.

Songs

Someday's Dreamers
Opening theme: "Kaze no Hana" by Hana Hana
Ending theme: "Under the Blue Sky" by The Indigo

Mahō Tsukai ni Taisetsu na Koto: Natsu no Sora
Opening theme: "Fly Away" by Thyme
Ending theme: "Kawaita Hana" (乾いた花) by micc

Media

Manga

Anime

Episode list
Someday's Dreamers

Episode list
Someday's Dreamers II: Sora

References

Further reading

External links
 Someday's Dreamers at Viz Media
 

2002 manga
2003 anime television series debuts
2003 manga
2008 anime television series debuts
2008 manga
Coming-of-age anime and manga
Geneon USA
Hal Film Maker
J.C.Staff
Kadokawa Shoten manga
NBCUniversal Entertainment Japan
Sentai Filmworks
Shōnen manga
Tokyopop titles
TV Asahi original programming
Viz Media manga